XHHTY-FM is a radio station on 107.1 FM in Martínez de la Torre, Veracruz. The station, owned by Diego Arrazola Becerra, carries the Ke Buen grupera format from Radiópolis.

History

XEUZ-AM 1330 received its concession on December 1, 1965. It was a 1,000-watt station. In the early 2000s, XEUZ became XEHTY-AM, which broadcast for a time on 1100 kHz and then migrated to FM in November 2010.

On February 24, 2020, XHHTY dropped La Mejor, the grupera format from MVS Radio, and began simply identifying as "107.1". In mid-March, it officially became Ke Buena.

References

External links
Ke Buena 107.1 Tlapacoyan Facebook

Radio stations in Veracruz
Radio stations established in 1965